Dhaka Attack is a Bangladeshi police action thriller film produced by Bangladesh Police Paribar Kallyan Samity Ltd., Three Wheelers Ltd. and Splash Multimedia. It features Arifin Shuvoo, Mahiya Mahi, ABM Sumon and Taskeen Rahman in lead roles. It was directed by Dipankar Dipon and written by Sunny Sanwar. The film was distributed by The Abhi Kathachitra and Swapna Scarecrow. The film won the "Best Film" award in 42nd Bangladesh National Film Awards.

Plot
The story centers on the Dhaka Metropolitan Police (DMP) Elite Forces' fierce operation against a terrorist organization, the attack is part of a plot by few foreign intelligence agencies to destabilize the country, in order to destroy the country's defense layers. The film stars Arifin Shuvo as the Assistant Commissioner of DMP, and the in-charge of Bomb Disposal Unit. Sumon played the role of a commander of SWAT Force. The film also features Afzal Hossain as the DMP Commissioner, Shatabdi Wadud as Intelligence officer, and Mahiya Mahi as a news reporter.

Cast
Superintendent of Police (SP) of Rangpur Biplob Kumar Sarkar in Dhaka attack movie scene.

 Arifin Shuvoo as Abid Rahman, Assistant deputy commissioner of DMP Detective Branch, and in-charge of Bomb Disposal Unit.
 Mahiya Mahi as Chaity, a crime journalist
 ABM Sumon as Ashfaq Hossain, In-charge of SWAT Special Forces Commander
 Taskeen Rahman as Azimul Karim Zishan, a serial killer
 Afzal Hossain as the DMP Commissioner
 Syed Hasan Imam as the Minister of Home Affairs
 Laila Hasan
 Shatabdi Wadud as Sajedul Karim, Bangladesh Police Intelligence Unit officer
 Quazi Nawshaba Ahmed as Sinthia, Ashfaq's wife 
 Mohammad Ali Haider
 Fahrin Ahmed
 Salina Saibi
 Alamgir as Alamgir, the Inspector-general of Bangladesh Police, in a special appearance
 Shipan Mitra as Rahat, in a special appearance
 Lamia Mimo in a special appearance in song "Tikatuli"
 Sanj John in a special appearance in song "Tikatuli"

Production
The filming officially began on 29 December 2015 at Pan Pacific Sonargaon. The film was first announced by Three Wheelers Films during early 2015, The film was to be directed by Dipankar Sengupta and Arifin Shuvo and Mahiya Mahi were signed as the lead actors. Riaz Uddin Ahamed Siddique was confirmed to join the cast in September 2015, but later opted out and replaced by ABM Sumon. The movie was shot in Dhaka, Chittagong, Bandarban and Mumbai. The first poster of the film released on 6 October 2017.

Costume design 
The film's costumes were designed by Nazmee Jannat and Sunny Sanwar. Nazmee said in an interview that whole team preferred "a very 'real' look", similar to that of Bangladesh Police, and wore relevant dresses those go with different critical situation throughout the movie.

Soundtrack

The soundtrack of Dhaka Attack was composed by Adit, DJ Rahat, Dabbu, Automonal Moon and Arindom. Indian singer Arijit Singh made his Bangladeshi debut, who has previously sung for India-Bangladesh co-productions.

Track listing

Release 
The film was released in three languages: Bengali, Malay, and English. The film was released on 6 October 2017 in Bangladesh, with worldwide release due on 20 October 2017.

References

External links
 
 

2017 films
Bengali-language Bangladeshi films
Films scored by Dabbu
Films scored by Arindam Chatterjee
Films scored by Adit Ozbert
Bangladeshi action thriller films
Law enforcement in fiction
Films about terrorism in Asia
2010s Bengali-language films
Best Film Bachsas Award winners
Best Film National Film Award (Bangladesh) winners